Barranco Glacier (once known as the Great Barranco Glacier) is near the summit of Mount Kilimanjaro in Tanzania, on the southwest slope of the peak and is a small remnant of an icecap which once crowned the top of Mount Kilimanjaro. The Great Barranco Glacier was far larger when first documented in the late 19th century and it along with the now extinct Little Barranco Glacier may have been fed by the Furtwängler Glacier which is on the top of the mountain. By 2011, Barranco Glacier was reduced to two small disconnected and dormant ice bodies.

See also
Retreat of glaciers since 1850
List of glaciers in Africa

References

Glaciers of Tanzania